Jamie Donnelly is an American actress known for her portrayal of Jan in the musical, and later film, Grease, along with Magenta in The Rocky Horror Show during its run in the Roxy Theatre in Los Angeles.

Biography
Donnelly was born in Teaneck, New Jersey.

Career
Donnelly is best known as Jan, one of the Pink Ladies from the musical and film Grease. While her film co-stars John Travolta and Jeff Conaway had appeared in the stage version of Grease as different characters, and Frankie Avalon reprised his film character on stage, Donnelly was the only person to reprise her stage character on film; she was 31 years old by the time the film was released and had to dye her graying hair to continue to fit the part.

In the early 1970s, she was in the United States premiere of The Rocky Horror Show starring as Magenta and the Usherette. She appeared on stage at the Roxy Theatre in Los Angeles with Tim Curry and Meat Loaf in 1974, when the show opened. She is featured on the original Roxy cast recording in her role, singing the opening song "Science Fiction/Double Feature". She went with most of the Roxy cast to reprise her roles on Broadway in 1975, but did not reprise the role in the film adaptation, as the British production's original Magenta, Patricia Quinn, reprised the role instead. Several years later, she was called to read for Grease.

During her stage career, she appeared in a musical version of Tarzan.

In 2017, she appeared as herself on the TV game show revival of To Tell The Truth. One of the 3 contestants was the real "pinkest lady in the world." After the real person was revealed, Jamie revealed herself to instead be one of the Pink Ladies in Grease.

Personal life
Donnelly is an acting coach who lives in La Canada, California, with her husband Stephen Foreman, a novelist. She has two adult children.

Filmography

References

American stage actresses
American film actresses
Living people
People from Teaneck, New Jersey
Actresses from New Jersey
Year of birth missing (living people)
21st-century American women